or  is a village in the municipality of Hamarøy in Nordland county, Norway. It lies halfway along the long and small Hellmofjorden, an arm of the Tysfjorden.

In 2016, Musken and the surrounding area has 33 full-year residents, although the population increases significantly in the summertime. The local school is now closed, but Musken school was one of two schools in the world that taught in the Lule Sami language (the other school in nearby Drag is still in operation).

Musken has Norway's only manual mail sorting centre. One of Northern Europe's deepest caves, Raggejavreraige, is located just south of Musken.

References

Hamarøy
Villages in Nordland
Populated places of Arctic Norway